Liliana Năstase (later Alexandru, born 1 August 1962) is a retired Romanian heptathlete. She won the world indoor title in 1993 and placed fourth at the 1992 Olympics, only 30 points behind the bronze medalist.

International competitions

References

1962 births
Living people
People from Vânju Mare
Romanian heptathletes
Romanian female hurdlers
Romanian female long jumpers
Olympic athletes of Romania
Athletes (track and field) at the 1992 Summer Olympics
Athletes (track and field) at the 1996 Summer Olympics
World Athletics Championships athletes for Romania
World Athletics Championships medalists
Universiade medalists in athletics (track and field)
Universiade gold medalists for Romania
Universiade silver medalists for Romania
Medalists at the 1987 Summer Universiade
Japan Championships in Athletics winners